Christopher Tsagakis (born July 27, 1979) is one of the founding members and current drummer for the band Rx Bandits. He is also a member of The Sound of Animals Fighting, with former bandmate Rich Balling, and has an electronic side project entitled Technology.

Chris was recently sponsored by Dark Horse Percussion, and now tours with a custom made four-piece Dark Horse Percussion drum set.

Personal life
Chris was born to Nancy Boyd (née Aros, formerly Tsagakis), a florist; and Mike Tsagakis, a landscaper. He is of Greek and white heritage. He has two younger siblings: Jonny Tsagakis, former member of Rx Bandits, and Gabriel Tsagakis.  Chris attended Los Alamitos High School, but graduated from Laurel High Continuation School in 1997. Chris married Ericka Swensson, a PhD student at the University of Southern California on August 20, 2004 at St. Timothy's Lutheran Church in Long Beach, CA. Chris was raised as a Jehovah's Witness, but no longer practices.

He is also a prolific painter. He sells his art on Etsy.

References 

 Spin.com: RX Bandits
 Chris Tsagakis on his solo act: Technology

External links 
 Rx Bandits.com – Official Website
 MySpace Profile
 Purevolume Profile
 Rx-Bandits.com -  Fan Website
 Chris Tsagakis's Homepage - Chris Tsagakis's Homepage

1979 births
Living people
American rock drummers
20th-century American drummers
American male drummers
21st-century American drummers
20th-century American male musicians
21st-century American male musicians
The Sound of Animals Fighting members
Rx Bandits members
American people of Greek descent